Conway Tearle (born Frederick Conway Levy, May 17, 1878 – October 1, 1938) was an American stage actor who went on to perform in silent and early sound films.

Early life
Tearle was born on May 17, 1878, in New York City, the son of the well-known British-born cornetist Jules Levy and American actress Marianne “Minnie” Conway. Tearle also had a sister, and a half-brother, musician Jules Levy, Jr., from his father's previous marriage. Minnie's mother was stage actress Sarah Crocker Conway. Minnie Conway was a direct descendant of William Augustus Conway, a British Shakespearean actor who became popular in America during the 1820s. Her father, the proprietor of the Brooklyn Theatre, was said to have organized the first stock company in America. After Tearle's parents separated, his mother married Osmond Tearle, a British Shakespearean actor popular in “the provinces”. Two half brothers, Godfrey and Malcolm Tearle, were born from Marianne's marriage to Osmond Tearle.

Conway Levy was educated in England and America and took to the stage at an early age. By the age of ten he could recite twelve Shakespearean plays from memory. As an adult he adopted his step-father's surname to become Conway Tearle. His big break came at the age of twenty-one when in Manchester, England, without any preparation, he was called upon to play Hamlet after the lead actor took ill just prior to the first act.

Career
Tearle's performance that night led to his first appearance on the London stage playing the Viscomte de Chauvin, the lead role in The Queen's Double, on April 27, 1901, at the Garrick Theatre.  He next toured Australia playing the title role in Ben Hur for some months before returning to London to star in the play The Best of Friends at the Theatre Royal. Tearle divided the following four seasons equally with companies headed by Ellen Terry and Sir Charles Wyndham.

In 1905 Tearle returned to America to play opposite Grace George in the short-lived play Abigail.  Over the next eight years or so Tearle played in a number of Broadway productions that failed to excite New York audiences. He did at times though garner singular praise for his performances in such plays as The New York Idea, The Liars, Major Barbara, and others. In 1908/09 Tearle reprised his title role in a lavish Klaw and Erlanger road production of Ben Hur.

Tearle turned to Hollywood in 1914 where he would find considerable success playing romantic leads. His first film was The Nightingale, a story by Augustus Thomas about a slum girl (Ethel Barrymore) who rose to be a great opera star.  His last was in a 1936 film adaptation of Shakespeare's Romeo and Juliet with John Barrymore.  Tearle appeared in some 93 films over his career and at one point was thought to be the highest-paid actor in America. On December 16, 1931, Conway appeared with co-star Kay Francis at the grand opening of the Paramount Theater in Oakland, California, which hosted the premiere of their film The False Madonna, released by Paramount Pictures.

The following year Tearle scored a major hit on Broadway in the original 1932 production of Dinner at Eight, creating the role of fading screen idol Larry Renault, a role that would later be played on film by John Barrymore.  His last two Broadway appearances were in short productions of Living Dangerously in 1935 and Antony and Cleopatra two years later.

Marriages

Conway Tearle married for the first time in 1901 in Sunderland, England. In 1908 Tearle filed for a divorce in Reno, Nevada on grounds of desertion, stating that his wife, Gertrude Tearle, had left him several years earlier.

His second wife, actress Josephine Park, sued for divorce in March 1912 after learning that Tearle had set sail for Italy aboard the S.S. Amerika with actress Roberta Hill. Roberta's name had earlier appeared in print as a co-respondent in a divorce suit filed by the wife of John Jacob Astor.

Tearle's third wife, Roberta Hill, filed for a divorce in 1916 after detectives she hired found him in a hotel room with Adele Rowland, a musical-comedy actress and singer. The two claimed they were just rehearsing a play.  As Rowland explained later:  “As to the robe in which I was clad, it's the custom in the profession to read plays attired like that.”

Tearle and Rowland wed in February 1918, remaining together until his death some twenty years later.

Death
One of Tearle's last starring roles was in Hey Diddle Diddle, a comedy play written by Bartlett Cormack. The play premiered in Princeton, New Jersey, on January 21, 1937, and also featured Lucille Ball playing the part of Julie Tucker, "one of three roommates coping with neurotic directors, confused executives, and grasping stars who interfere with the girls' ability to get ahead." The play received good reviews, but there were problems, chiefly with its star, because Tearle was in poor health.  Cormack wanted to replace him, but the producer, Anne Nichols, said the fault lay with the character and insisted the part needed to be reshaped and rewritten. The two were unable to agree on a solution. The play was scheduled to open on Broadway at the Vanderbilt Theatre, but closed after one week in Washington, D.C., due in part to Tearle's declining health.

Tearle died in Hollywood, California, from a heart attack, on October 1, 1938, aged 60.

Filmography

 The Nightingale (1914) as Charles Marden (film debut)
 Shore Acres (1914) as Sam Warner
 The Seven Sisters (1915) as Count Horkoy
 Helene of the North (1915) as Ralph Connell, aka Lord Traverse
 Poor Schmaltz (1915) as Jack
 The Foolish Virgin (1916) as Jim Anthony
 The Common Law (1916) as Neville
 The Heart of the Hills (1916) as Redgell
 The Fall of the Romanoffs (1917) as Prince Felix Yussepov
 The Judgment House (1917) as Ian Stafford
 The World for Sale (1918) as Ingolby
 Stella Maris (1918) as John Risca - also Spelled Riska
 Virtuous Wives (1918) as Andrew Forrester
 The Way of a Woman (1919) as Anthony Weir
 Atonement (1919) as Theodore Proctor
 Her Game (1919) as Alan Rutherford/Bruce Armitage
 The Mind the Paint Girl (1919) as Capt. Nicholas Jeyes
 A Virtuous Vamp (1919) as Jame Crowninshield
 Human Desire (1919) as Robert Lane
 Two Weeks (1920) as Kenneth Maxwell
 She Loves and Lies (1920) as Ernest Lismore
 The Forbidden Woman (1920) as Malcolm Kent
 April Folly (1920) as Kerry Sarle
 Marooned Hearts (1920) as Dr. Paul Carrington
 Whispering Devils (1920) as Rev. Michael Faversham
 The Road of Ambition (1920) as Bill Matthews
 Society Snobs (1921) as Lorenzo Carilo/Duke d'Amunzi
 The Oath (1921) as Hugh Coleman
 Bucking the Tiger (1921) as Ritchie MacDonald
 The Fighter (1921) as Caleb Conover
 After Midnight (1921) as Gordon Phillips/Wallace Phillips
 A Man of Stone (1921) as Capt. Deering
 Shadows of the Sea (1922) as Captain Dick Carson
 A Wide Open Town (1922) as Billy Clifford
 Love's Masquerade (1922) as Russell Carrington
 The Referee (1922) as John McArdle
 The Eternal Flame (1922) as Général de Montriveau
 One Week of Love (1922) as Buck Fearnley
 Bella Donna (1923) as Mahmoud Baroudi
 The Rustle of Silk (1923) as Arthur Fallaray
 Ashes of Vengeance (1923) as Rupert de Vrieac
 The Common Law (1923) as Louis Neville
 The Dangerous Maid (1923) as Capt. Miles Prothero
 Black Oxen (1923) as Lee Clavering
 The Next Corner (1924) as Robert Maury
 Lilies of the Field (1924) as Louis Willing
 The White Moth (1924) as Vantine Morley
 Flirting with Love (1924) as Wade Cameron
 The Great Divide (1925) as Stephen Ghent
 Bad Company (1925) as James Hamilton
 The Heart of a Siren (1925) as Gerald Rexford
 School for Wives (1925) as Richard Keith
 Just a Woman (1925) as Robert Holton
 The Mystic (1925) as Michael Nash
 Morals for Men (1925) as Joe Strickland
 The Dancer of Paris (1926) as Noel Anson
 Dancing Mothers (1926) as Jerry Naughton
 The Greater Glory (1926) as Count Maxim von Hurtig
 The Sporting Lover (1926) as Captain Terrance Connaughton
 My Official Wife (1926) as Alexander, aka Sascha
 Altars of Desire (1927) as David Elrod
 Enemies of Society (1927) as Dr. William Matthews
 The Isle of Forgotten Women (1927) as Bruce Paine
 Smoke Bellew (1929) as Kit 'Smoke' Bellew
 Gold Diggers of Broadway (1929) as Stephen Lee
 Evidence (1929) as Harold Courtenay
 The Lost Zeppelin (1929) as Commander Donald Hall
 The Truth About Youth (1930) as Richard Carewe
 The Lady Who Dared (1931) as Jack Norton
 Captivation (1931) as Hugh Somerton
 Pleasure (1931) as Gerald Whitney
 Morals for Women (1931) as Van Dyne
 The False Madonna (1931) as Grant Arnold
 Vanity Fair (1932) as Rawdon Crawley
 Man About Town (1932) as Bob Ashley
 The Hurricane Express (1932) as Stevens
 The King Murder (1932) as Detective Chief Henry Barton
 Her Mad Night (1932) as Steven Kennedy
 Day of Reckoning (1933) as George Hollins
 Should Ladies Behave (1933) as Max Lawrence
 Stingaree (1934) as Sir Julian Kent
 Fifteen Wives (1934) as Insp. Decker Dawes
 Sing Sing Nights (1934) as Floyd Harding Cooper
 The Headline Woman (1935) as Police Commissioner Frank Desmond
 Trails End (1935) as Jim 'Trigger' Malloy
 The Judgement Book (1935) as Steve Harper
 Desert Guns (1936) as Kirk Allenby/Bob Enright
 Senor Jim (1936) as Jim Stafford
 Klondike Annie (1936) as Vance Palmer
 The Preview Murder Mystery (1936) as Edwin Strange
 Romeo and Juliet (1936) as Prince Escalus

References

External links

father, Jules Levy
Tearle's mother and grandmother
 Minnie Conway, left, undated c.1870s

1878 births
1938 deaths
American male film actors
American male silent film actors
American male stage actors
American people of English descent
Male actors from New York City
20th-century American male actors